Cleome rutidosperma, commonly known as fringed spider flower or purple cleome, is a species of flowering plant in the genus Cleome of the family Cleomaceae, native to tropical Africa. This species is an invasive weed throughout most lowland wet tropical areas of Asia and Australia. It is a very common weed of lawns.

Description
Fringed spider flower is an erect, branched, annual herb, growing up to 15–100 cm tall. The plant has angular stems and trifoliolate leaves on stalk. Each leaflet is somewhat diamond-shaped. The flowers are very small (about 15 mm across) with upward pointing purple petals and protruding stamens and pistil. Pollens are elongated, approximately 29 microns in size.

References

rutidosperma
Flora of Africa
Annual plants